Laimetsa is a village in Järva Parish, Järva County in central Estonia.

References

Villages in Järva County
Kreis Fellin